Theodore Synkellos was a Byzantine clergyman, diplomat and writer who flourished in the first half of the 7th century. He wrote in Greek.

Theodore was a high-ranking clergyman in Constantinople in the 620s. He held the post of synkellos and so acted as a liaison between the emperor and the patriarch.

Theodore delivered a sermon on the Virgin's veil on the occasion of its temporary transfer from the church of Blachernae to the Hagia Sophia when the Avars attacked the suburbs of Constantinople in 619 or 623. Theodore's authorship has sometimes been questioned, because many manuscripts leave the text anonymous, but it is generally accepted. The text was certainly written by an eyewitness. Theodore refers to the veil generically as a "garment" (ἐσθής). According to the legend he knew, it was stolen from a Jewish widow by the patricians Galbios and Kandidos and was the same garment in which the Mary had nursed the infant Jesus.

According to the Chronicon Paschale, Theodore was a member of the embassy sent to the khagan of the Avars on 2 August 626, at the start of the Avar siege of Constantinople. Following the withdrawal of the Avars, he was commissioned by Patriarch Sergius to write a sermon on the siege. The sermon is anonymous in the manuscripts, but its attribution to Theodore is generally accepted. It makes full use of biblical language, especially Isaiah 7:1–9 and its account of a siege of Jerusalem during the reign of Ahaz. It was a major influence on George of Pisidia's Bellum Avaricum.

Notes

Bibliography

External links
English translation of the Homily on the Siege of Constantinople by Roger Pearse

7th-century Byzantine writers
Byzantine diplomats
Avar–Byzantine wars